The Taiwan Coal Mine Museum is a museum about coal mining in Pingxi District, New Taipei City, Taiwan.

History
The museum used to be the coal mining site during the later stage of Pingxi Era of Tai-Yiang Mining Inc called the New Pingxi Mine. It was first opened in 1965 and the first coal extracted was done in 1967. In 1997, the mining activity was halted due to the more competitive price from imported coal to Taiwan. With the help from railway enthusiasts and other associates that cared about the coal mining industry, Mr. Gong Yung-tsang began to create buildings in this historical site and created the museum in 2001 with the storing ground became the museum entrance.

After decades of mining, the site produced tons of abandoned overburden rocks which created a 140 meters high rock mountain. Due to the lack of vegetation growth to grasp firm holds of the gravel, the side of the rock mountain tumbled in July 2005, which created ''The Abandoned Rock Mountain’’.

Exhibitions
 Mine locomotive
 Large-scale mining machinery
 Small-scale exhibition hall
 Simulated pit

Transportation
The museum is accessible within walking distance northeast from Shifen Station of the Taiwan Railways.

See also
 List of museums in Taiwan
 Mining in Taiwan

References

External links

  

2001 establishments in Taiwan
Coal museums
Former coal mines in Taiwan
Industry museums in Taiwan
Museums established in 2001
Museums in New Taipei